Descatoire is a French surname. Notable people with the surname include:

Alexandre Descatoire (1874–1949), French sculptor
Jacques Descatoire (1920–1984), French bobsledder

French-language surnames